Frank Quinn may refer to:

Frank Quinn (Australian footballer) (1893–1973), St Kilda FC player
Frank Quinn (cricketer) (1915–1996), Irish cricketer
Frank Quinn (footballer, born 1926) (1926–2008), Scottish footballer (Celtic, Dundee United)
Frank Quinn (mathematician) (born 1946), American mathematician and professor of mathematics
Frank Quinn (outfielder) (1876–1920), American outfielder in Major League Baseball
Frank Quinn (pitcher) (1927–1993), American pitcher in Major League Baseball

See also
Francis Quinn (1921–2019), American Roman Catholic bishop
Francis Quinn (racing driver) (1903–1931), American racing driver
Fran Quinn, American golfer